Statistics of Campeonato da 1ª Divisão do Futebol in the 1988 season.

Overview
Wa Seng won the championship.

References
RSSSF

Macau
Macau
Campeonato da 1ª Divisão do Futebol seasons
football